The following are international rankings of Mongolia.

General
 United Nations: Human Development Index 2006, ranked 116 out of 177 countries
 A.T. Kearney/Foreign Policy Magazine: Globalization Index 2006, not ranked out of 62 countries

Economic
 The Wall Street Journal and the Heritage Foundation: Index of Economic Freedom 2006, ranked 60 out of 157 countries
International Monetary Fund: GDP (nominal) per capita 2006, ranked 125 out of 182 countries
International Monetary Fund: GDP (nominal) 2006, ranked 146 out of 181 countries
World Economic Forum: Global Competitiveness Index 2006-2007, ranked 92 out of 125 countries

Political
 Transparency International: Corruption Perceptions Index 2006, ranked 99  out of 163 countries
Reporters Without Borders: Worldwide press freedom index 2006, ranked 86 out of 168 countries

Environmental
Yale University: Environmental Sustainability Index 2005, ranked 71 out of 146 countries

Technological
Economist Intelligence Unit: E-readiness 2007, not ranked out of 69 countries

Social
Economist Intelligence Unit: Quality-of-life index 2005, not ranked

Cities
Ulaanbaatar: not ranked as a Global city

International rankings

References

Mongolia